İki Yabancı is a 1990 Turkish drama film, directed by Halit Refiğ and starring Hakan Ural, Brıgıtte Braun, and Kuzey Vargın.

References

External links

1990 films
Turkish drama films
1990 drama films
Films directed by Halit Refiğ
1990s Turkish-language films